Jeff Jensen (born 1970) is an American writer and journalist.

Early life
Jensen is a native of Seattle, Washington, and a graduate of the School of Visual Arts in New York City.

Career

Jensen is a screenwriter, journalist and author based in Lakewood, California.He started in journalism as a reporter for Advertising Age from 1992 to 1998. From 1998 to 2017, he wrote for Entertainment Weekly, covering TV shows like Lost and film franchises like Harry Potter, and was its chief TV critic from 2013 to 2017.

His graphic novel Green River Killer: A True Detective (Dark Horse Comics, 2011), drawn by Jonathan Case, won the Eisner for Best Reality-Based Work and was nominated for a Bram Stoker Award. He was a story editor on HBO's Emmy-winning limited series Watchmen, receiving Hugo and Nebula nominations for co-writing with Damon Lindelof the episode "A God Walks Into Abar". He was an executive producer and writer on the Brad Bird film Tomorrowland and co-authored the movie's prequel novel Before Tomorrowland (Disney Publishing, 2015) with Jonathan Case.

Jensen's other comic book credits include Leaf (created by Phil Avelli, NAB Publishing, 1991), Team Titans (DC Comics, 1993-1994) and X-Factor (Marvel Comics, 2002). His short story work can be found in Captain America: Red White and Blue (Marvel Comics, 2002), Love Is Love: A Comic Book Anthology to Benefit the Survivors of the Orlando Pulse Shooting (IDW Publishing, 2016), Planet of the Apes: When Worlds Collide (Boom! Studios, 2019) and Firefly: Watch How I Soar (Boom! Studios, 2020).

Better Angels: A Kate Warne Adventure, illustrated by George Schall, was published by Boom! Studios in October 2021.

References

People from Seattle
Novelists from Washington (state)
American comics writers
American graphic novelists
Living people
American male novelists
Year of birth uncertain
1970 births